Vidhya Number One (Vidhya No.1) (வித்யா நம்பர்: 1) is an Indian Tamil language television series airing on Zee Tamil and streams on ZEE5 digital platform. It stars Tejaswini Gowda, Niharika Harshu and Puvi Arasu in the lead roles. The series premiered on 27 December 2021. It is an official remake of Zee Telugu series No.1 Kodalu.

Synopsis
Vedavalli, a successful entrepreneur, believes in the importance of education and she wants her daughter-in-law to be educated. But Vidhya, an illiterate woman with immense native wisdom, becomes her daughter-in-law with unfortunate circumstances by marrying Sanjay. He hides the truth from Vedavalli and introduces her as maid and named as Vani. Sanjay educates her to get a good impression from Vedavalli.

Cast

Main
 Tejaswini Gowda as Vidhya Sanjay (Vaani) – A village woman; Sanjay's wife
 Niharika Harshu as Vedhavalli – Owner of the Vedha Group of Institutions; Sanjay's mother
 Eniyan (2021–2022) / Puviarasu (2022–present) as Sanjay – Vedhavalli's 2nd son; Vidhya's husband

Recurring
 Ilavarasan as Chandramohan – Vedhavalli's husband; Sanjay's father 
 Azhagu as Suryaprakashan – Sanjay's paternal grandfather; Chandramohan's father
 Siddarth Raj as Vijay – Vedhavalli's 1st son; Sanjay's elder brother
 Shwetha Venkat (2021–2023) / Yamuna Chinnadurai (2023–present) as Sneha – Vedhavalli's 1st daughter-in-law; Vijay's wife; Sanjay's elder sister-in-law; Thilakavathi's 1st daughter
 Padmini Chandrasekaran as Annapoorani – Vedhavalli's elder sister; Sanjay's elder maternal aunt
 Madhumitha Illaiyaraja as Manasa Karthik – Vedhavalli's daughter; Sanjay's younger sister; Karthik's wife
 Shankaresh Kumar as Karthik – Manasa's husband
 Niranjana Neithiar as Preethi: Sundari's daughter; Sanjay's ex-fianceè
 Anju as Sundari – Vedhavalli's friend and Preethi's mother
 Arvind Kathare (2021–2022) / Vasanth Gopinath (2022–present) as Madhavan – Vedavalli's personal assistant 
 Caroline Hiltrud (2021–2023) / Nilani Sathish (2023–present) as Shankunthala – Vedhavalli's arch-rival
 Jebin John as Darshan – Shankunthala's son
 Sheela (2021–2022) / Bhanumathi (2022–present) as Thilakavathi – Sneha & Meghna's mother
 Niharikka Ranjith as Meghna – Sneha's younger sister; Thilakavathi's 2nd daughter
 Murali Kumar as Selvam – Nila's husband; Vidhya's maternal uncle; Parvathy's elder brother; Sumathi's father
 Priyanaka as Nila – Selvam's wife; Vidhya's maternal aunt; Parvathy's elder sister-in-law
 Karate Raja as Manickkam – Vidhya and Lakshmi's father 
 Keerthana as Parvathy – Vidhya and Lakshmi's mother (deceased)
 Tharun Appasamy as John – Preethi's ex-husband

Special appearances
Bhagyaraj as Judge Subramani Vathiyar
Manorama as Subramani Vathiyar's mother (posthumous photographic appearance only)
 Anitha Sampath as Sathya (Fake Vidhya)

Adaptations

References

External links
 Vidhya No.1 at ZEE5
 

Zee Tamil original programming
Tamil-language romance television series
2021 Tamil-language television series debuts
Tamil-language television series based on Telugu-language television series
Tamil-language television soap operas
Television shows set in Tamil Nadu